Michel Niemeyer (born 19 November 1995) is a German professional footballer who plays as a midfielder for 3. Liga club Rot-Weiss Essen.

Career
Niemeyer was born in Salzwedel in Northeast Saxony-Anhalt and began playing football for his home-town club of SV Eintracht Salzwedel before moving on to 1. FC Magdeburg in 2008. He joined the Under 19 team of RB Leipzig in 2013. From 2014 he also played for the reserve team of that club, winning promotion to the Regionalliga Nordost in 2015.

However, he returned to 1. FC Magdeburg that summer, joining his former youth coach Jens Härtel who had signed as Magdeburg's manager a year earlier. He signed a contract until June 2017. He made his professional debut as a leftback in Magdeburg's 2–1 victory over Rot-Weiß Erfurt in the season opener of the 2015–16 3. Liga season.

On 21 May 2019, it was confirmed, that Niemeyer had joined SV Wehen Wiesbaden from the upcoming 2019–20 season on a two-year deal.

References

External links
 

1995 births
Living people
People from Salzwedel
German footballers
Footballers from Saxony-Anhalt
Association football midfielders
3. Liga players
2. Bundesliga players
1. FC Magdeburg players
SV Wehen Wiesbaden players
Rot-Weiss Essen players